CEHL could refer to one of two defunct ice hockey leagues:

 Canadian Elite Hockey League, semi-pro league the operated for the 2005–06 season
 Continental Elite Hockey League, junior league that operated from 2001 to 2004